Billy Graham Talagi is a Niuean politician and former Member of the Niue Assembly.

Career
Talagi was first elected to the Niue Assembly in a 1997 by-election. He has represented the village of Avatele in the Niue Assembly continuously since 1999. In 2005, 2008, and 2014 he was elected unopposed. In 2014 he was made Minister of Natural Resources in the Cabinet of Toke Talagi. In 2017 he was made Minister for Education and Social Services. In 2019 he served as Acting Prime Minister while Toke Talagi was receiving medical treatment in New Zealand.

In May 2018 Talagi was discharged without conviction after pleading guilty to assaulting MP Terry Coe outside the Niuean Assembly.

He contested the common roll in the 2020 Niuean general election but failed to win a seat.

Personal life
Billy Talagi had the brother Toke Talagi, who served as the Premier of Niue.

References

Members of the Niue Assembly
Ministers of Education of Niue
Social affairs ministers of Niue
Government ministers of Niue
Living people
Year of birth missing (living people)